Ginn or GINN may refer to:

Ginn, a character appearing in the television series Stargate Universe
Ginn & Co., an imprint of Pearson Education
Ginn & Co Solicitors, a UK law firm
Ginn and Company, a UK publisher, part of the Penguin Group
Bobby Ginn (born 1949), owner of Ginn Resorts and  the NASCAR Nextel Cup team Ginn Racing
Greg Ginn (born 1954), American musical artist
Hubert Ginn (born 1947), American football running back
Samuel Ginn (born 1937), American businessman and namesake of the Samuel Ginn College of Engineering at Auburn University
Ted Ginn Jr. (born 1985), American football wide receiver
Ted Ginn Sr. (born 1955), American football coach

See also
 Senator Ginn (disambiguation)
 
 Ginns, a surname